Andrew Hubatsek is an associate ensemble member of Bloomsburg Theatre Ensemble. He is also an actor, who performed in and directed such shows as On the Westward Trail and Y1K, Life in the Year 1000.

He also played the character of Zelda Goldman in the 1989 film Pet Sematary, and a cashier in Blue Steel (1990).

Hubatsek along with other people in the community works as a theater teacher in a popular theater group.

External links
New York Times filmography page
Bloomsburg Theatre Ensemble website

American theatre directors
Living people
Year of birth missing (living people)
Place of birth missing (living people)